Strumica is a municipality located in the eastern part of North Macedonia. Strumica is also the name of the city where the municipal seat is found. Strumica Municipality is part of the Southeastern Statistical Region.

Geography
The municipality borders Valandovo Municipality to the southwest, Konče Municipality to the northwest, Vasilevo and Bosilovo municipalities to the north, Novo Selo Municipality to the east and Greece to the southeast.

Demographics
According to the last national census from 2021, this municipality has 49,995 inhabitants. Ethnic groups in the municipality include:

References

External links
Official website

 
Southeastern Statistical Region
Municipalities of North Macedonia